Single White Female is the fourth studio album by American country music artist Chely Wright. The album was released on May 18, 1999, on MCA Nashville Records and was produced by Tony Brown, Buddy Cannon, and Norro Wilson. Single White Female became Wright's most successful album, receiving an RIAA certification and spawning two major hit singles. The album received mainly positive reviews from critics, many of which praised the blending of its musical differentiation.

Background 
Single White Female was recorded in January 1999 in Nashville, Tennessee, United States and consisted of ten tracks. The record was Wright's second collaboration with producer Tony Brown, but her first with both Buddy Cannon and Norro Wilson. Stephen Thomas Erlewine of Allmusic considered the album to "pick up where its predecessor left off", giving ten songs with "clean" and "tasteful arrangements". Erlewine then proceeds to say that the record's production helped to put Wright's vocals in the lead of the instrumentation instead of being left behind large orchestral arrangements. About.com found Single White Female to incorporate "a nice mixture of fast-paced songs and ballads." The reviewer then briefly described the production of the ten tracks: "The singles are really well-done, and the rest of the album is not what you'd call filler. The songs have that uniqueness that is Chely, and it's easy to see why this record is her most successful to date." Unlike her previous release, Wright only wrote or co-wrote two of the album's ten tracks: "Picket Fences" and "Some Kind of Somethin'". Fellow country artists Vince Gill, Alison Krauss, Patty Loveless, and Trisha Yearwood sing harmony vocals on several of the album's tracks. Single White Female included a re-recorded cover of Wright's 1996 single "The Love That We Lost". In addition, the album's sixth track "The Fire" would later be recorded by Mindy McCready on her 2002 self-titled record.

Critical reception 
Single White Female was given for the most part, positive reviews from critics. Writing for Country Standard Time, Rick Teverbaugh called the album "more mature" and "thoughtful" than her latter record. Teverbaugh later mentioned that the track "Picket Fences" seemed as if it was "TV inspired", while he considered "Some Kind of Somethin'" to be a "lighter" track on the record. Teverbaugh then discussed the ninth track "Rubbin' It In", calling it the most "clever" song on the record. Teverbaugh described the plot behind the song: "...about a woman so self-absorbed in her own lovesickness that she believes everyone knows and is making her more aware of her own misery." About.com gave Single White Female a fairly mixed review, stating that the release "was filled with songs of emotion, happy or sad." The site gave the song "The Love That We Lost" negative feedback, calling the production on it, "bland and pop". The album's seventh track "Picket Fences" was also given a negative response, finding its tempo to drag. The reviewer then gave his/her reasoning: "The slow tempo of the song just makes things seem to drag, and frankly, I'm not inclined to be sympathetic to the character's story." Overall however, the site found the album to be "a collection of songs which range in emotion from happy-go-lucky to taking charge of your life." Writing for Allmusic, Stephen Thomas Erlewine gave Single White Female four out of five stars, stating that most of its tracks do not immediately grab the listener's attention, but will eventually work well into someone's memory. Erlewine noted that Wright's best vocal performances were on the album's balances, however he found the title track and "The Fire" to be "equally convincing". He concluded that the album's tracks are the main reasons that the record is a "welcome addition" to Wright's catalog of music.

Release and singles 
Single White Female released its lead song, the title track, as the album's first single in March 1999. The song became Wright's first Top 10 single and her first and only number one hit, reaching the top spot in September 1999. The title track also reached #36 on the Billboard Hot 100  and also topped the Canadian Country Tracks chart. The album itself was released on May 18, 1999 and peaked at #15 on the Billboard Top Country Albums chart, #124 on the Billboard 200, and #16 on the RPM Country Albums/CD's chart. The second single released was the third track entitled "It Was", which was issued in September 1999, peaking at #11 on the Billboard Hot Country Singles & Tracks chart and #52 on the Canadian Country Tracks chart. The third and final single released from Single White Female was the record's second track "She Went Out for Cigarettes". The song reached #49 on the Hot Country Singles & Tracks list and #84 on the Canadian Country Tracks chart.

Track listing

Personnel 
 Pat Buchanan – electric guitar
 Chad Cromwell – drums
 Stuart Duncan – fiddle, mandolin, background vocals
 Dan Dugmore – acoustic slide guitar, steel guitar
 Vince Gill – background vocals
 Aubrey Haynie – fiddle, mandolin, background vocals
 John Hobbs – Hammond B-3 Organ, keyboards
 Sonya Isaacs – background vocals
 Alison Krauss – background vocals
 Patty Loveless – background vocals
 Terry McMillan – percussion
 Steve Nathan – keyboards
 Melonie Cannon Richardson – background vocals
 Matt Rollings – piano, Hammond B-3 organ, keyboards
 Robby Turner – steel guitar
 John Willis – acoustic guitar
 Glenn Worf – bass guitar, background vocals
 Chely Wright – lead vocals
 Trisha Yearwood – background vocals

Sales chart positions

Weekly charts

Year-end charts

Singles

References 

1999 albums
MCA Records albums
Chely Wright albums
Albums produced by Tony Brown (record producer)
Albums produced by Norro Wilson